The 2001 FIBA European Championship, commonly called FIBA EuroBasket 2001, was the 32nd FIBA EuroBasket regional basketball championship held by FIBA Europe, which also served as Europe qualifier for the 2002 FIBA World Championship, giving a berth to the top four (or five, depending on Yugoslavia reaching one of the top four places) teams in the final standings. It was held in Turkey between 31 August and 9 September 2001. Sixteen national teams entered the event under the auspices of FIBA Europe, the sport's regional governing body. The cities of Ankara, Antalya and Istanbul hosted the tournament. Yugoslavia won its eighth FIBA European title by defeating hosts Turkey with a 78–69 score in the final. Vlado Šćepanović scored 19 points for Yugoslavia, while İbrahim Kutluay scored 19 for Turkey. Yugoslavia's Peja Stojaković was voted the tournament's MVP.

Venues

Qualification

Of the sixteen teams that participated in EuroBasket 2001, the top eight teams from the previous tournament qualified directly. The other eight teams earned their berths via a qualifying tournament.

Format
The teams were split in four groups of four teams each where they played a round robin. The first team from each group qualified directly to the knockout stage. To define the other four teams that advanced to the knockout stage, second and third-placed teams from each group where cross-paired (2A vs. 3B, 3A vs. 2B, 2C vs. 3D, 3C vs. 2D) and the winner from each match advanced to the knockout stage.
In the knockout quarterfinals, the winners advanced to the semifinals. The winners from the semifinals competed for the championship in the final, while the losing teams play a consolation game for the third place.
The losing teams from the quarterfinals play in a separate bracket to define 5th through 8th place in the final standings.

Squads

At the start of tournament, all 16 participating countries had 12 players on their roster.

Preliminary round

Times given below are in Eastern European Summer Time (UTC+3).

Group A

|}

Group B

|}

Group C

|}

Group D

|}

Knockout stage

Championship bracket

Play-off

Quarterfinals

Semifinals

Third place

Final

5th to 8th place

Statistical leaders

Individual Tournament Highs

Points

Rebounds

Assists

Steals

Blocks

Minutes

Individual Game Highs

Team Tournament Highs

Offensive PPG

Rebounds

Assists

Steals

Blocks

Team Game highs

Awards

Final standings

References

External links
 2001 European Championship for Men archive.FIBA.com

 
2001
Euro
Euro
2001
2001
Baskeyball
21st century in Antalya
Sports competitions in Istanbul
2000s in Ankara
2000s in Istanbul